Gary N Nickels (born 1958) is a retired English boxer.

Boxing career
Nickels was the National Champion in 1978 after winning the prestigious Amateur Boxing Association British flyweight title, boxing out of Repton ABC.

He represented England in the -51 kg flyweight division, at the 1978 Commonwealth Games in Edmonton, Alberta, Canada.

He turned professional on 9 October 1978 and fought in 32 fights.

References

Living people
1958 births
British male boxers
Boxers at the 1978 Commonwealth Games
Flyweight boxers
Commonwealth Games competitors for England